The Under-Secretary for Ireland (Permanent Under-Secretary to the Lord Lieutenant of Ireland) was the permanent head (or most senior civil servant) of the British administration in Ireland prior to the establishment of the Irish Free State in 1922.

The Under-Secretary's residence was at Ashtown Lodge in Phoenix Park, also known as the Under Secretary's Lodge.

Among the best-known holders of the office was Thomas Henry Burke, who was assassinated along with the Chief Secretary for Ireland, Lord Frederick Cavendish, in the so-called Phoenix Park Killings on Saturday, 6 May 1882.

In April 1887 Colonel Edward Robert King-Harman was appointed Parliamentary Under-Secretary to the Lord Lieutenant, but he died on 10 June 1888 and no further appointments were made.

Under-Secretaries for Ireland
 Thomas Waite 1747–1774

 Sackville Hamilton 1780–1795
 Lodge Morres 1795
 Sackville Hamilton 1795–1796
 Edward Cooke 1796-1801
 Alexander Marsden 1801-1806
 James Traill 1806-1808
 Sir Charles Saxton 1808-1812
 William Gregory 1812-1831
 Sir William Gossett 1831-1835
Thomas Drummond 1835–1840
Norman Hilton Macdonald 1840–1841
Edward Lucas 1841–1845
Richard Pennefather 1845–1846
Sir Thomas Nicholas Redington 1846–1852
John Arthur Wynne 1852–1853
Sir Thomas Aiskew Larcom 1853–1868
Sir Edward Robert Wetherall 1868–1869
Thomas Henry Burke 1869–1882
Sir Robert George Crookshank Hamilton 1882–1886
Sir Redvers Henry Buller 1886–1887
Sir Joseph West Ridgeway 1887–1893
Sir David Harrel 1893–1902
Sir Antony MacDonnell 1902–1908
Sir James Brown Dougherty 1908–1914
Sir Matthew Nathan 1914–1916
Sir Robert Chalmers 1916
Sir William Byrne 1916–1918
James Macmahon 1918–1922 (jointly with Sir John Anderson from 1920)
Sir John Anderson 1920–1922 (jointly with James Macmahon)

Assistant Under-Secretaries for Ireland
From 1852 to 1876 the Assistant Under-Secretary was called Chief Clerk. After the retirement of Marmion Savage as Clerk of the Privy Council of Ireland in 1853, the Chief Clerk/Assistant Under-Secretary was ex-officio Clerk of the Privy Council of Ireland.

Sources
 Chris Cook and Brendan Keith, British Historical Facts 1830–1900 (Macmillan, 1975) p. 149.

Citations

History of Ireland (1801–1923)
Political office-holders in pre-partition Ireland